Live 88 is a second live album from the Serbian rock band Ekatarina Velika. It was released in 1997 by the band's ex drummer, Ivan "Firchie" Fece. The album contains recording of the concert held in 1988 in SNP, Novi Sad, together with two songs from the concert in Zagreb "Kulušić" club from the same year.

Track listing
(music by Ekatarina Velika except where noted, arrangements by Ekatarina Velika, lyrics by Milan Mladenović except where noted)

"Modro i zeleno" 
"To sam ja" (lyrics: EKV)
"7 dana" (lyrics: M. Stefanović)
"Tonemo" 
"Voda"  
"Oči boje meda"
"Budi sam na ulici" 
"Ljudi iz gradova" 
"Pored mene" 
"Tattoo"  
"Ti si sav moj bol"
"Ljubav"
"Soba" (#)
"Jesen" (music: Katarina II) (#)

(#) Live from "Kulušić" club, Zagreb, 1988

Personnel

Milan Mladenović - vocals, guitar
Margita Stefanović - piano, keyboards, vocals
Bojan Pečar - bass
Ivan "Firchie" Fece - drums

Additional personnel
Theodore Yanni - guitar (3)

External links

Ekatarina Velika albums
1997 live albums